Zambia has five large power stations, of which four are hydroelectric and one is thermal. A fifth hydroelectric power plant is under construction at Itezhi-Tezhi Dam (120MW) along with a coal powered power station at Maamba (300MW) as of 2015. There are also a number of smaller hydroelectric stations, and eight towns not connected to the national power transmission grid are served by diesel generators.

In 2014 the combined power generation from an installed capacity of 2,396MW was 14,453GWh, of which 91.2% came from hydroelectric plants.

The majority of the plants are owned and operated by ZESCO, the national power utility.

Hydroelectric

Operational

Under construction

Thermal

Operational

Solar

Other Projects 
In March 2022, Chariot Limited of the United Kingdom together with Total Eren of France and Canadian mining giant First Quantum Minerals entered into a partnership to develop a 430MW solar and wind power project in Zambia.

References 

Zambia
 
Power stations